Siphoactia is a genus of parasitic flies in the family Tachinidae. There are at least two described species in Siphoactia.

Species
These two species belong to the genus Siphoactia:
 Siphoactia charapensis Townsend, 1927
 Siphoactia peregrina Cortes & Campos, 1971

References

Further reading

 
 
 
 

Tachinidae
Articles created by Qbugbot